The Red Tag is an artificial fly originally designed as a dry fly for grayling and trout in the north country of England.  The fly pattern, when introduced into Australia, particularly Tasmania, became extremely successful and popular for brown trout and remains today as one of the most essential flies for Australian fly anglers.

Origin
The Red Tag was originally designed by Martyn Flynn from Worcestershire, England in the 1850s as a dry fly for grayling in north country rivers. Its original name was the Worcestershire Gem and was also known as the Worcestershire Wonder.

Materials
The typical Red Tag is tied with a body of peacock herl, a tail of red or crimson wool, and a red cock's hackle (actual color of hack is reddish brown). The hackle can be hen's hackle for wet fly versions.  Hook sizes vary from #16 through #10.

Variations
As described in Australia’s Best Trout Flies - Revisited  (2016), Malcolm Crosse unless otherwise attributed
 Red Palmer 
 CDC Red Tag
 Reverse Red Tag
 Red Tag Nymph
 1-2-1 Guide Tag
 Seal's Fur Red Tag
As described in The New Illustrated Dictionary of Trout Flies (1986), John Roberts
 Badger Red Tag
 Treacle Parkin
 Green Tag

Notes

Dry fly patterns
Wet fly patterns